Warner-Spector Records was a record label formed on October 12, 1974 as an outlet for Phil Spector productions by Warner Bros. Records. The label lasted for three years. Except for a new single by Cher, "A Woman's Story", and a Dion album, Born to Be with You, which was released only in the United Kingdom, all the releases on Warner-Spector were reissues of product from Philles Records, the label Phil Spector had co-founded in 1962.

See also
 List of record labels

References

Defunct record labels of the United States
Warner Music labels
Record labels established in 1974
Phil Spector
1974 establishments in the United States